Edward Coode, MBE (born 19 June 1975) is a British rower, twice World Champion and Olympic Gold medalist.

Early life
Born in Cornwall in 1975, Coode boarded at Papplewick School and Eton College. He studied marine biology at University of Newcastle upon Tyne and Keble College, Oxford, and rowed in the Oxford crew at the 1998 Boat Race.

Career
Coode won his first World Championship in 1999, as a substitute in the British men's coxless four, rowing with Steve Redgrave, Matthew Pinsent and James Cracknell. When Tim Foster returned to the four, Coode was put into the coxless pair with Greg Searle. They finished fourth at the 2000 Sydney Olympics having led for most of the race and being overtaken by three crews in the last 600 m, finishing 12/100th of a second (about 2 feet) out of third place.

In 2001, he won a second World Championship in the men's coxless four with Steve Williams, Rick Dunn and Toby Garbett. In 2002, he missed the World Championships due to injury, Josh West taking his place in the coxless four, and was in the men's eight in 2003 that won the bronze at that year's world championships.

With the injury to Alex Partridge, Coode was moved from the eight to the coxless four for the 2004 Summer Olympics in Athens, rowing with Pinsent, Cracknell and Williams. In a close race with World champions Canada, they won gold.

Retirement
In October 2004, Coode announced he was retiring from rowing – taking a year out to travel in South America and then study for a law degree at University of the West of England in Bristol. Following two years at university he spent two years as a trainee solicitor at Bristol firm Burges Salmon, before qualifying and joining family law firm Coodes Solicitors, which has branches across Cornwall.

Personal life
Coode was appointed Member of the Order of the British Empire (MBE) in the 2005 New Year Honours for services to sport.

On 17 September 2005 Coode married Clare Smales in the St Mary's and St Julian's Church, Maker, Cornwall. Their daughter Beatrice Mary Arundell Coode (Bee) was born in February 2007. Their second daughter Ottilie Mary Loveday was born in March 2009. Their first son Johnny was born at Christmas 2011 and their second son Wilfred was born in July 2013.

Achievements

 Olympic Medals: 1 Gold
 World Championship Medals: 2 Gold, 2 Bronze
 Junior World Championship Medals: 1 Silver
 Oxford University Blue Boat (lost)

Olympic Games
2004 – Gold, Coxless four (with James Cracknell, Steve Williams, Matthew Pinsent)
2000 – 4th, Coxless pair (with Greg Searle)

World championships

2003 – Bronze, Eight
2001 – Gold, Coxless four (with Steve Williams, Rick Dunn, Toby Garbett)
1999 – Gold, Coxless four (with Steve Redgrave, Matthew Pinsent, James Cracknell)
1998 – 7th, Eight
1997 – Bronze, Coxed four

Junior World championships
1993 – Silver, Coxless four

References

External links
 Ed Coode – The London Speaker Bureau
 

1975 births
Living people
English male rowers
British male rowers
Olympic rowers of Great Britain
Rowers at the 2000 Summer Olympics
Rowers at the 2004 Summer Olympics
English Olympic medallists
Olympic gold medallists for Great Britain
People educated at Papplewick School
People educated at Eton College
Alumni of Newcastle University
Alumni of Keble College, Oxford
Members of the Order of the British Empire
Members of Leander Club
Sportspeople from Cornwall
Oxford University Boat Club rowers
Olympic medalists in rowing
Medalists at the 2004 Summer Olympics
World Rowing Championships medalists for Great Britain